The 1910 European Figure Skating Championships were held from February 10 to 11 in Berlin, German Empire. Elite figure skaters competed for the title of European Champion in the category of men's singles.

Results

Men

Judges:
 A. Strasilla  (CSR)
 Martin Gordan 
 H. Wendt 
 P. Kersten 
 Fritz Hellmund 
 Franz Zilly 
 E. Schirm

References

Sources
 Result list provided by the ISU

European Figure Skating Championships, 1910
European Figure Skating Championships
European 1910
European Figure Skating Championships, 1910
February 1910 sports events
1910s in Berlin
Sports competitions in Berlin